Paphinia litensis is a species of orchid endemic to Ecuador.

Taxonomy 
The classification of this orchid species was published by Calaway H. Dodson & Tilman Neudecker in Die Orchidee. Distribution ranges through the Esmeraldas (Ecuador, Western South America, Southern America). Originally collected by Calaway H. Dodson. The holotype is kept at Rio Palenque Science Center (RPSC), Ecuador.

References

External links 
 
 

litensis
Endemic orchids of Ecuador